The Haliwa-Saponi Indian Tribe, also the Haliwa-Saponi Tribe, is a state-recognized tribe and nonprofit organization in North Carolina. They are not a federally recognized as a Native American tribe.

They are headquartered in Hollister, North Carolina.

Formerly named the Haliwarnash Indian Club, they adopted their current form of government in 1953 and were recognized in 1965 by the state of North Carolina. The tribe has created schools and other institutions to preserve its culture and identity. They primarily belong to Protestant Christian churches, mostly Baptist and Methodist.

Name 
The name Haliwa is a portmanteau from the two counties: Halifax and Warren. In 1979 the tribe added Saponi to their name to reflect their descent from the historical Saponi peoples, part of the large Siouan languages family, who were formerly located in the Piedmont of present-day Virginia and the Carolinas.

Membership 
The Haliwa-Saponi comprise slightly more than 3,800 members. About 80 percent of tribal members reside within a 6-mile radius of the small unincorporated town of Hollister, in Halifax and Warren counties. Some tribal members are also located in Nash and Franklin counties.

Government 
The Haliwa-Saponi Indian Tribe is governed by an 11-member council elected to three-year staggered terms by the members of the tribe. These include an elected chief and vice-chief.

Recognition 
The state of North Carolina recognized the Haliwa Saponi Tribe in 1965. In 1997, the state legislature passed Senate Bill 1074 that updated state recognition to the Haliwa Saponi Tribe of North Carolina.

They are not a federally recognized as a Native American tribe. and have never petitioned for federal recognition. 

In 2022, North Carolina representative G. K. Butterfield introduced House Resolution 9536, which voices support for federal recognition for the Haliwa-Saponi Indian Tribe of North Carolina. He had introduced a similar bill in 2021 which died.

Education

Members founded the Haliwa-Saponi Tribal School in 1957, which was assisted by the state as a public school. All other public schools had long been segregated as white or black (all people of color) under state law, and the Haliwa Saponi claimed a separate identity. The school closed in the late 1960s following the court-ordered integration of public schools on constitutional grounds.

In 1999, with funds from the state Department of Public Instruction (DPI), the tribe established a charter school in the same building as the earlier tribal school.  Focused on Haliwa-Saponi culture, this new school has expanded in space and enrollment over time, and by 2007 served grades K-12.

In 1977 the tribe established the Haliwa-Saponi Day Care Center, to serve children aged two to five. The tribe manages a myriad of programs and services for its members, including, but not limited to, housing, substance-abuse-prevention programs, cultural programs and others.

History 
The Haliwa-Saponi claim descent from the Tuscarora, Nansemond, and Saponi a Siouan-speaking Native American tribe of North America's Southeastern Piedmont.

18th century 

By the beginning of the century, continuous warfare with the Haudenosaunee and, especially, repeated outbreaks of infectious diseases contracted from Europeans reduced the once populous Saponi. Joining with the Tottero, the Saponi migrated to northeastern North Carolina to be closer to the center of Virginia's colonial trade and gradually became allied with the colonists. In 1711, the Carolina colony went to war with the powerful Iroquoian-speaking Tuscarora, in part because the latter resisted Indian slavery.

With the defeat of the Tuscarora two years later, the colony and its allied Saponi met in Williamsburg with the Tuscarora and Nottoway to discuss the terms of peace. Most of the Tuscarora migrated from Carolina to present-day New York, where by 1722 they were adopted as the Sixth Nation of the Iroquois Confederacy, to whom they were related by language and culture. The Saponi entered into a new treaty of trade with Virginia's governor, Alexander Spotswood.

On February 27, 1714, the Virginia colony reached an agreement. The remnants of the Saponi, Tottero, Occaneechi, Keyauwee, Enoke (or Eno), and Shakori formally coalesced, becoming "The Saponi Nation." Another band, the Stuckanox, soon joined the Saponi Nation.  Despite the success in treaty-making and tribal coalitions, the years between 1709 and 1714 were extremely difficult.  Disease caused continuing population decline.  Travelers enumerated the Saponi Nation at a little more than 300 people. That same year, the Virginia Council asked the Nansemond tribe to merge with the Saponi to strengthen their settlements.  They hoped these people could create a buffer between Virginia's plantation settlements, other Southeastern Siouan Piedmont Native Americans, and the Haudenosaunee from the North.

Fort Christanna 

To strengthen Virginia's borders, Alexander Spotswood convinced the colonial Board of Trade to approve the establishment of Fort Christanna between the Roanoke and Meherrin rivers, about thirty-two miles north of the present-day Haliwa-Saponi powwow grounds.  Fort Christanna was built to protect the Virginia colony in two critical ways: as a bulwark intended to ward off the military assault, and as a center for the Christian conversion and education of the Saponi and other Southeastern groups.  Fort Christanna also served as a major trading post for the corporate Virginia Indian Company.

Decline of Indian trade 
Roughly 70 Saponi children were educated and converted to Christianity at Fort Christanna by the missionary teacher Charles Griffin of North Carolina. By 1717, under charges of monopoly, the Colonial Board of Trade lost interest in the Fort and ordered the Virginia Indian Company to disband and dissolve. The Saponi Nation continued to maintain peaceful trade relations with the colony.  A portion of the Saponi Nation continued living in the Fort Christanna area from 1717 to 1729. Another group of Saponi migrated into northern Virginia, near Fredericksburg on the Rapahannock River.

Historians Marvin Richardson and C. S. Everett note historical documentation for the modern Haliwa-Saponi tribe as descending from a group that arose during the 1730s, a tumultuous time of decline of the Indian trade.  The divisive Tuscarora and Yamasee wars affected colonists, Native Americans and Indian trade in Virginia and the Carolinas. Remnants of smaller tribes coalesced after this period to continue their Indian culture and identity. A group of Saponi migrated south to the militarily and linguistically related Catawba, in what is now northeastern South Carolina. They occupied a village there from 1729 to 1732, but in 1733 returned to the Fort Christianna area with some Cheraw. Discovering that colonists had taken patents on their traditional territory, the Saponi made agreements with Virginia for new lands.

They also made a separate arrangement with the remaining band of Tuscarora in April 1733, to live with them and under their sovereignty. The majority of the Saponi migrated to North Carolina with traders and planters, settling in what are now Halifax and Warren counties.  Fewer went to the reservation for the Tuscarora, known as Reskooteh Town and Indian Wood. It was located in Bertie County. The reservation consisted initially of 40,000 acres (160 km²) and bordered eastern Halifax County.

By 1734, some Algonquian-speaking Nansemond lived with the Nottoway in Virginia.  Other Nansemond had resettled near the Tuscarora in North Carolina. 

During the 1730s and 1740s and through the time of the American Revolution, because of living in more diverse areas, the Saponi intermarried with European colonists and free people of color, but Saponi mothers raised their mixed-race children in Saponi culture. After the Revolution, the Native Americans maintained a separate identity from both the European Americans and African Americans, and married mostly within the Indian community. In addition, they created institutions to support their cultural identity as American Indians.

Virginia traders such as Colonel William Eaton, who wanted to continue their business relations with the tribes, also migrated to North Carolina. He was a resident of "Old Granville" (modern-day Franklin, Warren, and Vance) counties. He traded with the Saponi, Catawba, and others.

Migrations
In 1740 most of the remaining Saponi in Virginia moved north to Pennsylvania and New York, where they merged with the Iroquois for protection. After the American Revolutionary War and victory by the colonists, they moved with the Iroquois to Canada, as four of the six nations had been allies of the British and were forced to cede their territories in New York State. The British government provided land and some relocation assistance to their Iroquois allies. This was the last time in which the Saponi tribe appeared in the historical record. The families are known to be descendants of and closely associated into the core Richardson, Silver, Mills, Evans, Hedgepeth and Lynch families. Most Haliwa-Saponi Indians trace direct lineage to Benjamin Richardson ( the core Richardson family consisting of Emily Richardson & Frank Richardson, Mason Richardson, Rhease Richardson, Eliza Silver, Alfred & Hardie Richardson), Martha Silver, Patsy Lynch ( Mother of Charles Lynch), James Evans, Stephen Hedgepeth, Nathan Mills & others. 

From the 1730s to the 1770s, Haliwa-Saponi ancestors settled in and near the modern Haliwa-Saponi area in North Carolina.  The Haliwa-Saponi community began coalescing in "The Meadows" of southwestern Halifax County, North Carolina immediately after the American Revolution. Much reduced in number, the few remaining Tuscarora migrated from Bertie County to New York in 1804, joining others on a reservation there. Their reservation land in North Carolina had been steadily reduced through the eighteenth century and was finally sold off. By the 1800s some Haliwa Saponi families such as Richardson, Copeland, Hedgepeth, and Lynch moved to Chillicothe, Ohio.

19th century 
Over the course of the 19th century, the Haliwa-Saponi maintained a tight-knit tribal community in modern Halifax, Warren, Nash, and Franklin counties and generally practiced endogamy.  Having become Christian, they belonged mostly to the predominant Protestant churches: the first they established was Jeremiah Methodist Church in the mid-1870s in Halifax County. Later some of the congregation left and built the Pine Chapel Baptist Church.

While the Reconstruction legislature established public school systems for the first time after the American Civil War, legislators were forced to accept segregated schools to get the bill passed.  In the binary system that evolved out of the slave society of the South, especially as whites tried to restore white supremacy after Reconstruction, they classified most mixed-race people of any visible African ancestry as black (colored), although ethnic Indians had traditionally had rights as free people of color for decades before the Civil War. Haliwa-Saponi children were required to go to schools with the children of newly emancipated freedmen. After 1877 and the end of Reconstruction, the Haliwa spent the late 19th century fighting for separate Indian schools. They also organized a more formal tribal governance structure. In the 1870s the Haliwa-Saponi began meeting at Silver Hill, a remote location within the Meadows.

With the rise of Jim Crow laws in the late 19th century, the Haliwa-Saponi and African Americans were disfranchised by state law in 1896 and a new constitution in 1899 that was discriminatory in the application of poll taxes, literacy tests and grandfather clauses. This was the pattern for every former Confederate state, beginning with Mississippi in 1890 and proceeding through 1908. The Haliwa continued their efforts to build and maintain separate cultural institutions.

These early efforts at formal re-organization resulted in approval by the state for Indian schools: Bethlehem School (1882) in Warren County and the Secret Hill School in Halifax County. Early tribal leaders worked to start the process of reorganizing tribal government and gaining recognition, but in the post-Reconstruction era with the rise of Jim Crow laws, they found little support. In the segregated state, few official records of the period recorded any people as Indian.

20th century 
Richardson and Everett note that issues of race and ethnicity became more complex when numerous African-American laborers were recruited in 1906 for a growing timber industry and moved with their families into the Meadows area. By 1908 they started to attend Pine Chapel Baptist Church, but some Haliwa wanted to have separate worship and started a third church, St. Paul's Baptist Church.  It had an all-Indian congregation until the 1950s.

Later in the 20th century, the local Indian schools closed. Tribal leaders in the 1940s, including John C. Hedgepeth, tried to have birth certificates of members indicate their American Indian ethnicity, with little success. The state classified people as only black (colored) or white.

They organized in the 1940s under the name Haliwarnash Indian Club, later shortened to Haliwa Indian Club. They changed their name in 1979 to include a reference to the historic Saponi. They are headquartered in Hollister, North Carolina.

In 1956, the Haliwa-Saponi joined the National Congress of American Indians.

Haliwa-Saponi organization and institutions 
In 1953, the tribe re-organized its government into the current structure, through the leadership of Hedgepeth, Lonnie Richardson, B.B. Richardson, Chief Jerry Richardson (First Chief under the new governance structure), Percy Richardson (Second Chief under the new governance structure, who also served as the first Vice Chief after the reorganization), with W. R. Richardson the Third Chief of the tribe, James Mills, Theadore Lynch, and others.

After the US Supreme Court ruled in Brown vs. The Board of Education (1954) that segregation of public schools was unconstitutional, the state undertook resistance by what was called the Pearsall Plan, which allowed municipalities to make funds available to create private neighborhood schools. The Haliwa-Saponi took advantage of this provision to build and operate the private Haliwa Indian School, which was attended only by Indian children.  They operated it from 1957 to 1969. After a few years of its operation, the State Department of Public Instruction (DPI) provided funding for teacher salaries. Tribal members paid for supplies and materials, the building, and maintenance, much as parents do at parochial schools.

In 1957, the Haliwa Indian Tribe built the Saponi Indian Church, since renamed Mt. Bethel Indian Baptist Church, in Warren County. Sometimes other people of color, resented the Indians' separate ethnic identity within the segregated social system. The increasing African-American activism for civil rights highlighted some of the tensions between the ethnicities.

In 1965, North Carolina formally recognized the Haliwa Indian Tribe. In 1967 the Haliwa opened their tenth annual Haliwa Pow-wow to the public, inviting state and local officials and Indians from other states. They added Saponi to the tribal name in 1979 to reflect their Siouan ancestry.

In 1974, the Haliwa-Saponi formed a 501(c)(3) nonprofit organization. Its mission statement is "The mission of the Haliwa-Saponi indian Tribe is to protect the interests, identity, and rights of the Haliwa-Saponi indian people and to promote the cultural and traditional heritage of the Haliwa-Saponi people of Halifax, Warren, and surrounding counities."

The tribe has since built an updated headquarters administration building, multipurpose building, and instituted various service programs. Programs include but are not limited to tribal housing, daycare, senior citizens program, community services, Workforce Investment Act, cultural retention, after-school and youth programs, energy assistance, and economic development. 

The Haliwa-Saponi opened a school in 2000, the Haliwa-Saponi Tribal School, 98 percents of whose students identify as American Indian. The school, a public charter school, bases its curriculum on the North Carolina state standard course of study and offers small classrooms, technology, and American Indian studies. The school had 161 enrolled students in 2020.

Controversy 
In 2011, the Haliwa-Sapomi Tribe was audited by the state of North Carolina and found to have submitted an inaccurate grant application.

"The audit, prompted by a citizen's complaint, alleged false information was included on the tribe's grant application to Golden LEAF for the project." "It found the tribe misrepresented itself in saying it had tribal council review and approval for the grant, an approved loan for $700,000 and a $600,000 HUD grant for matching funds, because HUD does not allow Indian Housing Block Grant funds for projects rejected by tribes.

Testing irregularities in the 2010-11 academic year at Haliwa-Saponi Tribal School resulted in 9 student's biology test scores being invalidated and Haliwa-Saponi Tribal School Principal Chenoa Davis resigning. Community members expressed concerns related to the investigation during a meeting of the school board. Ronald Richardson, tribal chief of the Haliwa-Saponi, said that the tribe should work out its own problems without newspaper publicity. School board Chairman Gideon Lee declined to identify the teacher in question who downloaded state biology test information, but said that action has been taken against those determined to be involved.

When Professor Robert K. Thomas visited with the Haliwa in the Summer of 1978, the founders and members never mentioned the word "Saponi", instead calling their ancestry "Cherokee". In Cherokee Communities of the South, the only family of Saponi found among North Carolina was the Collins family (unrelated to the Haliwa).

Activities 
The Haliwa-Saponi hosts an annual powwow on the third weekend in April on the dance grounds at the Haliwa-Saponi Tribal School. They launched it in 1965 to celebrate their state recognition. Originating on the Great Plains, the powwow "also builds on local and regional values, and ideas about tribe, community and race."  Held the third weekend of April, the pow-wow is funded in part by ad sales, donations, corporate funding and gate receipts, in addition to grants from the North Carolina Arts Council.

The tribe operates a cultural retention program for tribal citizens of all ages, held at the tribe's multi-purpose building. The program includes instruction in pottery, beadwork/regalia design and construction, dance/drum classes, and Haliwa-Saponi history, as well as day trips to culturally relevant locations.

Notable Haliwa-Saponi
 Cameron Lynch, an American football linebacker for the Tampa Bay Buccaneers of the National Football League
 Brooke Simpson, contestant on The Voice

Notes

References 
 Cumming, William P. Mapping the North Carolina Coast: Sixteenth-Century Cartography and the Roanoke Voyages, North Carolina Department of Cultural Resources: Division of Archives and History, 1988.
 Farris, Phoebe. "Images of Urban Native Americans: The Border Zones of Mixed Identities", Journal of American Culture 20 (Spring 1997).
 Howard, James H. "Pan-Indianism in Native American Music and Dance," Ethnomusicology 27 (Jan., 1983): 71-82.
 Lawson, John. A New Voyage to Carolina, ed. Hugh Talmadge Lefler. Chapel Hill: University of North Carolina Press, 1967.
 Leaming, Hugh P. Hidden Americans: Maroons of Virginia and the Carolinas, New York, NY: Garland Publishing, 1995.
 Lederer, John. The Discoveries of John Lederer, Ann Arbor, MI: University Microfilms, 1966.

External links 
 Haliwa-Saponi official website
 North Carolina Commission of Indian Affairs

1953 establishments in North Carolina
Cultural organizations based in North Carolina
Halifax County, North Carolina
Native American tribes in North Carolina
Non-profit organizations based in North Carolina
State-recognized tribes in the United States
Washington County, Alabama